Ernst Goldenbaum (15 December 1898, Parchim, Mecklenburg-Schwerin – 13 March 1990) was an East German politician.

Biography
Goldenbaum was born in Parchim. During World War I he served in the military and he participated in the German November Revolution. In 1919 he joined the left-wing USPD and a few years later the Communist Party of Germany.

From 1923 to 1925 he was a member of the city council of Parchim and from 1924 to 1932 he was a member of the Landtag of Mecklenburg-Schwerin. From 1932 to 1933 he was the editor of Volkswacht, a communist newspaper. After the Nazis seized power he became a farmer and a member of the German resistance.

In 1944 he was arrested and he spent the last year of the war in concentration camp Neuengamme. In 1945, he was one of very few who survived the sinking of the SS Cap Arcona which claimed over 4000 lives.

After the war he joined the Socialist Unity Party (SED), but in 1948 he co-founded the communist-sponsored Democratic Farmers' Party of Germany (DBD). The DBD was a close ally of the SED. Until 1982, Goldenbaum was the Chairman of the party.

From 1949 to 1990 Goldenbaum was a member of the People's Chamber. From 1949 to 1950 Goldenbaum was East Germany's first Minister of Agriculture and Forestry. Goldenbaum supported the SED's collectivisation in the 1950s and 1960s. From 1950 to 1963 he was the deputy chairman of the People's Chamber. After 1963 he was a member of the Presidium of the People's Chamber.

See also
 Democratic Farmers' Party of Germany

External links

1898 births
1990 deaths
People from Parchim
People from the Grand Duchy of Mecklenburg-Schwerin
Independent Social Democratic Party politicians
Communist Party of Germany politicians
Socialist Unity Party of Germany politicians
Democratic Farmers' Party of Germany politicians
Members of the State Council of East Germany
Members of the Provisional Volkskammer
Members of the 1st Volkskammer
Members of the 2nd Volkskammer
Members of the 3rd Volkskammer
Members of the 4th Volkskammer
Members of the 5th Volkskammer
Members of the 6th Volkskammer
Members of the 7th Volkskammer
Members of the 8th Volkskammer
Members of the 9th Volkskammer
Peasants Mutual Aid Association members
German military personnel of World War I
Communists in the German Resistance
Neuengamme concentration camp survivors
Recipients of the Patriotic Order of Merit (honor clasp)
Recipients of the Banner of Labor